Zhou Lansun (23 January 1939 – 2000) was a Chinese table tennis player and coach. He was a member of the Chinese team that won the men's team gold medal at the 1965 World Table Tennis Championships in Ljubljana. As coach he trained several world champions and won the national honorary sports medal four times.

Biography
Zhou was born in Hangzhou, Zhejiang Province on 23 January 1939, with ancestry in Shangrao, Jiangxi. He was chosen for the Shanxi provincial table tennis team in 1957, and the Chinese national team the following year. He won a bronze medal in the men's doubles at the 1961 World Table Tennis Championships in Beijing, with partner Wang Jiasheng. At the 1965 World Table Tennis Championships in Ljubljana, Yugoslavia, he was a member (with Li Furong, Xu Yinsheng, Zhang Xielin, and Zhuang Zedong) of the Chinese team that won the men's team gold medal. At the same event, he also won bronze medals in the men's singles and in the men's doubles (with Yu Changchun).

Zhou became a coach of the Chinese national team in 1973, and trained several male and female world champions, including Cao Yanhua, Guo Yuehua, Chen Xinhua, Zhang Deying, and Qi Baoxiang. In Cao Yanhua's memoirs, she called Zhou almost a "devil", and recalled that though she fainted several times during training, he made her continue practicing after she regained consciousness. His training regimen was highly effective though, and Cao won her first national championship after only two months of training under Zhou, which she called miraculous. She went on to win multiple gold medals in world championships, and after winning two gold medals at the 1985 World Championships, she hung one of them around Zhou's neck. Zhou won the national honorary sports medal four times.

Zhou also coached Chiang Peng-lung, who became one of the best players in Taiwan, and later he coached the Australian national table tennis team.

In late 2000, Zhou died of an illness in Beijing, at the age of 61.

References

1939 births
2000 deaths
Chinese male table tennis players
Sportspeople from Hangzhou
Table tennis players from Zhejiang
World Table Tennis Championships medalists